John Peter Hannah (born January 5, 1962) is a senior counselor at Foundation for Defense of Democracies, and a senior advisor to Chairman Ron Wahid of Arcanum, a global strategic intelligence company and a subsidiary of Magellan Investment Holdings.  He was formerly a senior fellow at the  Washington Institute for Near East Policy, a Washington, DC think tank which was founded in 1985. He is also a former national security adviser to U.S. Vice President Dick Cheney from 2005 to 2009.

Early life
Hannah's father was an oil executive working for Shell in the 1960s and 1970s. The Hannah family was stationed in Libya before Muammar Gaddafi came to power and nationalized the oil industry. They returned to the U.S. in the late 1970s and lived  in Huntington, New York, for several years, before moving to Bahrain. Hannah graduated from Huntington High School in 1980., then went on to graduate from Duke University and Yale Law School.

Career
On October 31, 2005, Cheney named Hannah as his assistant for national security affairs.  At the same time, Cheney appointed another Duke alumnus, David S. Addington, as his chief of staff.  The two took over duties that had previously been jointly held by I. Lewis "Scooter" Libby. Hannah had originally been on loan to the Office of the Vice President from the office of former State Department official and U.S. Ambassador to the United Nations John Bolton.

On February 11, 2007, The Washington Post reported that an unnamed ambassador present in a meeting with Hannah had been "taken aback" by a remark Hannah made that the Bush administration considered 2007 to be "the year of Iran," with Hannah indicating that he believed a U.S. attack on that country to be a real possibility.

Personal life
Hannah and his wife Laura have two children and are members of the Temple Sinai, Washington, D.C., having joined in the fall of 2006.

References

External links

SourceWatch profile of John Hannah
RightWeb profile of John Hannah
John Hannah, Center for Cooperative Research.
Cheney and the 'Raw' Intelligence, Newsweek, December 15, 2004
John Hannah serves as Senior Advisor to the Chairman at Arcanum Global

1962 births
Living people
George W. Bush administration personnel
Yale Law School alumni
Duke University alumni